George John Bennett, Mus.Doc. (5 May 1863 –1930) was an English cathedral organist and composer, who served in Lincoln Cathedral from 1895.

Background

George John Bennett was born on 5 May 1863 in Andover, Hampshire. He studied at the Royal Academy of Music under G.A. Macfarren and C. Steggall, and also abroad, in Berlin under H. Barth (piano) and F. Kiel (composition) as well as in Munich (1885-1887) under H. Bussmeyer (piano) and Josef Rheinberger (composition).

Career

Organist of:
St. John's Church, Pimlico
Lincoln Cathedral (1895–1930)

Family
Bennett married, at Lincoln Cathedral on 20 February 1900, Marion Ruston, second daughter of Joseph Ruston, of Monks Manor, Lincoln, a former MP and Mayor of Lincoln. The ceremony was performed by the Lord Bishop of Lincoln, assisted by the Dean of Lincoln and the Archdeacon of Lincoln.

Works

 2 overtures for orchestra
 Suite in D minor for orchestra
 Mass in B flat major for soli, choir and orchestra
 Piano trio in E major
 Piano pieces
 Organ pieces

References

1863 births
1930 deaths
English classical organists
British male organists
Cathedral organists
Male classical organists